Plethystic substitution is a shorthand notation for a common kind of substitution in the algebra of symmetric functions and that of symmetric polynomials.  It is essentially basic substitution of variables, but allows for a change in the number of variables used.

Definition

The formal definition of plethystic substitution relies on the fact that the ring of symmetric functions  is generated as an R-algebra by the power sum symmetric functions

 

For any symmetric function  and any formal sum of monomials , the plethystic substitution f[A] is the formal series obtained by making the substitutions

 

Examples

If  denotes the formal sum , then .

One can write  to denote the formal sum , and so the plethystic substitution  is simply the result of setting  for each i.  That is,

 .

Plethystic substitution can also be used to change the number of variables: if , then  is the corresponding symmetric function in the ring  of symmetric functions in n variables.

Several other common substitutions are listed below.

If  is a homogeneous symmetric function of degree , then
 
If  is a homogeneous symmetric function of degree , then 
 , 
 where  is the well-known involution on symmetric functions that sends a Schur function  to the conjugate Schur function .
The substitution  is the antipode for the Hopf algebra structure on the Ring of symmetric functions.

The map  is the coproduct for the Hopf algebra structure on the ring of symmetric functions.
 is the alternating Frobenius series for the exterior algebra of the defining representation of the symmetric group, where  denotes the complete homogeneous symmetric function of degree .
 is the Frobenius series for the symmetric algebra of the defining representation of the symmetric group.

External links
Combinatorics, Symmetric Functions, and Hilbert Schemes (Haiman, 2002)

References
M. Haiman, Combinatorics, Symmetric Functions, and Hilbert Schemes, Current Developments in Mathematics 2002, no. 1 (2002), pp. 39–111.

Combinatorics
Symmetric functions